This is a list of the French Singles & Airplay Chart Reviews number-ones of 1983.

Summary

Singles Chart

See also
1983 in music
List of number-one hits (France)

References

1983 in French music
1983 record charts
Lists of number-one songs in France